Hanseat was a German fishing trawler that was built in 1926 as Sirius. Renamed Hanseat in 1929, she was requisitioned by the Kriegsmarine in the Second World War for use as a Vorpostenboot, serving as V 312 Hanseat. She ran aground and was wrecked in September 1942.

Description
The engine was built by J. C. Tecklenborg. It was rated at 100nhp. It drove a single screw propeller via a low-pressure turbine.

History
Sirius was built as yard number 406 by J. C. Tecklenborg, Geestemünde, Germany for Sirius Handels GmbH, Germany. She was launched on 5 August 1926 and completed on 3 September. The fishing boat registration BX 189 was allocated, as were the Code Letters QVLB. In 1929, she was sold to the Hanseatische Hochseefisherei. Her port of registry was Altona. In 1934, her Code Letters were changed to DQNV, On 13 January 1931, Hanseat sank at Bremerhaven. She was refloated two days later.

She was scheduled to have participated in Unternehmen Seelöwe in 1940. On 3 May 1941, Hanseat was requisitoned by the Kriegsmarine for use as a vorpostenboot. She was allocated to 3 Vorpostenflotille as V 312 Hanseat. On 20 August 1942, she ran aground and was wrecked on Naissaar, Soviet Union.

References

Sources

1926 ships
Ships built in Bremen (state)
Fishing vessels of Germany
Steamships of Germany
Maritime incidents in 1931
Auxiliary ships of the Kriegsmarine
Maritime incidents in August 1942